Boneh-ye Atabak (also Romanized as Boneh-ye Atābak and Boneh Atābak) is a village in Howmeh-ye Sharqi Rural District, in the Central District of Ramhormoz County, Khuzestan Province, Iran. At the 2006 census, its population was 67, in 17 families.

References 

Populated places in Ramhormoz County